Hervé Revelli (born 5 May 1946) is a French former footballer who played as a forward. He is well–known for having won the French Championship a joint–record seven times.

Career
Revelli scored 31 Ligue 1 goals during the calendar year of 1969. Fifty years later in 2019, Kylian Mbappé became the first French player to score at least 30 goals in a calendar year in Ligue 1 since Revelli's feat.

Revelli is the joint-top scorer in the Derby Rhône-Alpes between Saint-Étienne and Lyon with 14 goals along with former Lyon player Fleury Di Nallo. He finished his career in SC Draguignan, having already started a career as playing manager.

In addition to Switzerland and France, he managed in Tunisia and Algeria as well as the national teams of Mauritius and Benin.

Personal life
He is the brother of former professional footballer, Patrick Revelli.

Honours
Saint-Étienne
 Ligue 1: 1966–67, 1967–68, 1968–69, 1969–70, 1973–74, 1974–75, 1975–76
 Coupe de France: 1969–70, 1973–74, 1974–75, 1976–77

Notes

References

External links
 
 
 
 news.bbc.co.uk

1946 births
Living people
People from Verdun
Sportspeople from Meuse (department)
French footballers
Association football forwards
France international footballers
AS Saint-Étienne players
OGC Nice players
CS Chênois players
LB Châteauroux players
SC Draguignan players
Ligue 1 players
Ligue 2 players
French expatriate footballers
Expatriate footballers in Switzerland
French expatriate sportspeople in Switzerland
French football managers
LB Châteauroux managers
CS Sfaxien managers
Mauritius national football team managers
Club Athlétique Bizertin managers
MC Oran managers
MC Alger managers
Benin national football team managers
ES Sétif managers
Expatriate football managers in Switzerland
Expatriate football managers in Tunisia
French expatriate sportspeople in Tunisia
Expatriate football managers in Algeria
French expatriate sportspeople in Algeria
Ligue 2 managers
Tunisian Ligue Professionnelle 1 managers
Algerian Ligue Professionnelle 1 managers
French expatriate sportspeople in Benin
Expatriate football managers in Benin
Footballers from Grand Est
French expatriate sportspeople in Mauritius
Expatriate football managers in Mauritius
Association football player-managers
Sportspeople from Bouches-du-Rhône
Footballers from Provence-Alpes-Côte d'Azur